Terence Daniel Coughlan (born 25 February 1956) is a former Zimbabwean cricketer. A right-handed batsman and right-arm leg break bowler, he played two first-class matches for Mashonaland Country Districts during the 1993–94 Logan Cup.

Coughlan played four first-class matches for Zimbabwe-Rhodesia B in the 1979/80 Castle Bowl tournament and one match for Zimbabwe B against Pakistan B in 1990. He also played List A cricket for Zimbabwe and Zimbabwe Country Districts, as well as one match for Mashonaland Country Districts against Tasmania in 1995.

Coughlan was born in Gwelo (now Gweru), Midlands.

References

External links
 
 

1956 births
Living people
Sportspeople from Gweru
Mashonaland cricketers
Zimbabwean cricketers